Wilbert Harrison (1867 – after 1892) was an English professional footballer who played in the Football Alliance for Birmingham St George's and Small Heath.

Harrison was born in the Bordesley Green district of Birmingham. He played football for Birmingham Excelsior before joining Birmingham St George's in 1886. He became the star of their attack, and played for them in the Football Alliance, but was one of several players offloaded when the club got into financial difficulties and joined local rivals and fellow Football Alliance club Small Heath in August 1891. He played only once for Small Heath's first team, scoring both goals in a 2–2 draw at Ardwick in January 1892, but his career was in decline, and later that year he returned to local football with Summerfield Saints.

References

1867 births
Year of death missing
Footballers from Birmingham, West Midlands
English footballers
Association football forwards
Birmingham Excelsior F.C. players
Birmingham St George's F.C. players
Birmingham City F.C. players
Date of birth missing
Place of death missing
Football Alliance players